Maria Aldana Cetra (born 17 July 1980) is an Argentine professional racing cyclist. She rides for the Itau Shimano Ladies Power Team.

See also
 List of 2015 UCI Women's Teams and riders

References

External links

1980 births
Living people
Argentine female cyclists
Place of birth missing (living people)
21st-century Argentine women